Hopefully is an adverb which means "in a hopeful manner" or, when used as a disjunct, "it is hoped".  Its use as a disjunct has prompted controversy among advocates of linguistic purism or linguistic prescription.

Use as a disjunct 
Merriam-Webster says the disjunct sense of hopefully dates to the early 18th century and had been in fairly widespread use since at least the 1930s.  Objection to this sense of the word only became widespread in the 1960s.  Merriam-Webster says that this usage is "entirely standard".  Before 2012,  the AP Stylebook proscribed the use of "hopefully" as a disjunct. 

The controversy over its use is similar to those surrounding words or phrases such as "begging the question", "bemused", "nauseous", "who" vs. "whom" and the loss of the distinction between "disinterested" and "uninterested." The use of "hopefully" as a disjunct is reminiscent of the usage of the German word hoffentlich ("it is to be hoped that").

References

Linguistic controversies
English words
English usage controversies